The British National Derny Championships are annual bicycle races held in the United Kingdom.

The event was originally run as a motor paced event behind the larger stayer motors, but in 2000 a demonstration championship was run using derny bikes, opening the championship up to wider participation. The first official championship took place in 2001 for the Ron Pugsley Trophy. The British Cycling National Derny Paced Championship is run over 30 km.

The event was known as the amateur motor paced championships from 1970 to 1993, and simply the motor paced championships from 1994 to 1999; it was held at a distance of 50 km. A professional motor paced championship was run in 1982 over one hour.

The event is still often referred to as the motor paced or stayer championships, but this is a misnomer, because a motor paced or stayers race is one where the pacing machine is a modified motorbike of anything from 100cc to 2000cc engine size which has a roller mounted behind the back wheel. The cyclist or follower uses a bicycle which has a small front wheel and trailing front forks, which if it hits the roller merely spins the roller without causing any damage.  Motor pacing lost popularity in the late 1990s due to its esoteric nature and Derny racing was introduced. There is a move by Motor pacing fans to revive the Motor Paced Championships in the future.  Motor Pacing is still very popular on the continent.

A Derny is a two-stroke engine assisted bicycle and the cyclist or follower can ride a normal track bike, making the discipline readily accessible to most track cyclists.  Always held on a cycling track, the riders follow a derny throughout the race. The rider of the derny is known as their pacer. The event is relatively long for track racing, and usually held separately to the British National Track Championships which consist of multiple shorter events. A women's championship over 15 km was first introduced in 2005 and won by the Scottish rider, Katie Cullen.

Event history
 Amateur 50km Motor Paced Championship (1970–1993)
 Amateur and Professional editions (1982)
 Open 50km Motor Paced Championship (1994–1999)
 Open 30km Derny Championship (from 2000)

Results

Men's past winners

Women's past winners

References

Past Results at cyclingwebsite.net
Past Results at dernysportuk.com
2007 results at British Cycling
2008 results at British Cycling
2009 results at British Cycling
2010 results at British Cycling
2011 results at British Cycling
2012 results at British Cycling

Cycle racing in the United Kingdom
National track cycling championships
National championships in the United Kingdom
Annual sporting events in the United Kingdom